Polona Hercog successfully defended her title after defeating Mathilde Johansson in the final 0–6, 6–4, 7–5.

Seeds

Draw

Finals

Top half

Bottom half

Qualifying

Seeds

Qualifiers

Lucky loser
  Jill Craybas

Draw

First qualifier

Second qualifier

Third qualifier

Fourth qualifier

External links
 Main Draw
 Qualifying Draw

Swedish Open - Singles
2012 Women's Singles
2012 in Swedish women's sport